Richard Doey (born 27 December 1956) is a Canadian rower. He competed in the men's coxed four event at the 1984 Summer Olympics.

References

External links
 

1956 births
Living people
Canadian male rowers
Olympic rowers of Canada
Rowers at the 1984 Summer Olympics
Sportspeople from Chatham-Kent